Vaidas Kariniauskas (born 16 November 1993) is a Lithuanian professional basketball player for Rapid București of the Liga Națională.

Professional career

Kariniauskas won the NKL bronze in 2012 and 2013 with BC Žalgiris-2. On 19 November 2013, he was loaned to BC Lietkabelis in order to get more playing time. After his loan spell, he rejoined Žalgiris for the 2014–15 season, winning the LKL league and the LKF Cup.

On 19 June 2015, Kariniauskas signed a 1+1 year deal with Kymis of the Greek A2 Basket League.

On 18 August 2016, Kariniauskas signed with Italian club Pallacanestro Cantù of the LBA. On 1 February 2017, he parted ways with Cantù. The same day, he signed with Romanian club U BT Cluj-Napoca.

On 22 July 2021, Kariniauskas signed with Rytas Vilnius of the Lithuanian Basketball League.

On 2 August 2022, Kariniauskas signed a one-year deal with Brose Bamberg of the German Basketball Bundesliga.

On 8 December 2022, Kariniauskas signed with Rapid București of the Romanian Liga Națională.

National team career
Kariniauskas was an active participant on youth competitions and won a silver medal at the 2009 European U-16 Championship. In 2015 ,he was included into the Lithuania men's national basketball team head coach Jonas Kazlauskas extended candidates list. Though, he was not invited to the training camp later on. He was invited to the training camp the following year. Firstly, Kariniauskas did not qualify for the Olympic roster, but later on he replaced Edgaras Ulanovas due to injury.

References

External links
Vaidas Kariniauskas at euroleague.net
Vaidas Kariniauskas at fiba.com

1993 births
Living people
ABA League players
Basketball players at the 2016 Summer Olympics
BC Lietkabelis players
BC Nevėžis players
BC Rytas players
BC Žalgiris players
BC Žalgiris-2 players
Brose Bamberg players
CS Universitatea Cluj-Napoca (men's basketball) players
CSM Oradea (basketball) players
KK Igokea players
Kymis B.C. players
Lega Basket Serie A players
Lithuanian expatriate basketball people in Bosnia and Herzegovina
Lithuanian expatriate basketball people in Germany
Lithuanian expatriate basketball people in Greece
Lithuanian expatriate basketball people in Italy
Lithuanian expatriate basketball people in Romania
Lithuanian men's basketball players
Olympic basketball players of Lithuania
Pallacanestro Cantù players
Point guards
Shooting guards
Sportspeople from Alytus